This is a list of Members of Parliament (MPs) elected to the Jatiya Sangsad (National Parliament of Bangladesh) by Bangladeshi constituencies for the 10th Parliament of the Bangladesh.

It includes both MPs elected at the 2014 general election, held on 5 January 2014, and Nominated women's members for reserved seat and those subsequently elected in by-elections.

Members

Elected members

Nominated women members

References 

Members of the Jatiya Sangsad by term